Labeobarbus ansorgii is a species of ray-finned fish in the  family Cyprinidae. It is endemic to the Kwango River in Angola.

References

Endemic fauna of Angola
ansorgii
Taxa named by George Albert Boulenger
Fish described in 1906